Khukhan is a district (amphoe) of Sisaket province, northeastern Thailand.

Geography 
Neighboring districts are (from the north clockwise) Prang Ku, Wang Hin, Phrai Bueng, Khun Han and Phu Sing of Sisaket Province, and Buachet, Sangkha and Si Narong of Surin province.

Prior to a re-organization of Thailand for administrative and logistical reasons circa 1945, Khukhan was the provincial capital and is still recognized as the historical center of Sisaket. The reorganization may have been justified in order to connect all the provincial capitals of the lower northeast by the rail line that runs east-west between Korat and Ubon. Khukhan is 48 kilometres south of that line.)

History
Today Khukhan is the second most populous district in the province and has numerous roads connecting it to all parts of the province dating back to its earlier importance as the provincial capital. Locally several temples (wat, วัด) date to the earliest introduction of Buddhism in the area and according to local legend a battle was fought north of the city c. 1400 which then prompted the founding of Khukhan by royal decree.

Administration
The district is divided into 22 sub-districts (tambon), which are further subdivided into 279 villages (muban). Mueang Khukhan is a sub-district municipality (thesaban tambon) which covers parts of the sub-district Huai Nuea. There are 22 Tambon administrative organizations (TAO).

Missing numbers are tambon which now form Phu Sing district.

References

External links 
 amphoe.com

Khukhan